Elizeu Antônio Ferreira Vinagre Godoy (born 17 October 1945), known as just Elizeu, is a Brazilian former footballer who competed in the 1964 Summer Olympics.

References

1945 births
Living people
Association football midfielders
Brazilian footballers
Olympic footballers of Brazil
Footballers at the 1964 Summer Olympics
Santos FC players